"Take Me to the Other Side" is the second single from the English alternative rock band Spacemen 3. It was recorded at VHF studios in Rugby, Warwickshire, and released in July 1988 as a 12" single.

Track listing
12" (GLAEP12054)

Personnel

Spacemen 3
Sonic Boom – vocals, guitar, producer
Jason – guitar, vocals, organ, producer
Pete "Bassman" Bain - bass guitar
Rosco – drums

Additional personnel
Alex Green - saxophone 
Mick Manning - trumpet 
Graham Walker - engineer

References

1988 singles
Glass Records singles
1988 songs